Wöhler  may refer to:
 People
 August Wöhler (1819–1914), German engineer
 Cordula Wöhler (1845–1916), German writer and hymnwriter
 Friedrich Wöhler (1800–1882), German chemist
 Otto Wöhler (1894 in Burgwedel – 1987 in Burgwedel), German general
 Jürgen (Otto) Wöhler (born 1950 in Oberlahnstein), German lawyer and manager

 Other
 Wöhler (crater), a crater on Earth's moon
 Wöhler curves used in mechanical fatigue analysis
 Wöhler process, a chemical process used in the production of aluminum
 Wöhler synthesis, the chemical reaction in which ammonium cyanate is converted into urea

See also 
 Wohlers

German-language surnames